The Shadow of the Sun (literally "Ebony") is a travel memoir by the Polish writer and journalist Ryszard Kapuściński. It was published in 1998 and by Penguin Books in 2001 with the English translation by Klara Glowczewska.

Description
Kapuściński spent nearly 30 years in various African countries such as Kenya, Rwanda, Nigeria, Ethiopia and more, detailing his account of the development of the African states.

Kapuściński's experience in Africa was unique, because he had the opportunity to stay with people of various classes in society, staying with ministers, as well as peasants in rural villages which gave him an honest perspective on what was the current situation of the continent.

References

Excerpt from The Shadow of the Sun published in USA Today

1998 non-fiction books
Books about Africa
Polish non-fiction books
British travel books
Books by Ryszard Kapuściński
English non-fiction books